Mandel is a Dutch, German and Jewish surname, or any of several people with that surname.

Mandel may also refer to:

Places
Mandel, Germany, a place in Rhineland-Palatinate
Mandel (river), Belgium

People
Mandel Szkolnikoff (1895–1945), Russian businessman
Mandel Kramer (1916–1989), American actor
Mandel "Mandy" Patinkin (born 1952), American actor

Fictional characters
Mandel Karlsson, a Swedish comic character

Other uses
Mandel (nut), the German name for almonds
Mandel Photo Postcard Machine, camera
Mandel notation, a representational system in algebra
 Kleindienst v. Mandel, a United States Supreme Court decision on immigration
Shkedei marak, also known as "soup mandels"

See also

Mandell, surname
Mandl, surname
Mandle, surname

Mendel (disambiguation)